Adenosciadium is a monotypic genus of flowering plant belonging to the parsley family, Apiaceae. The single species, Adenosciadium arabicum is endemic to the Sultanate of Oman in the extreme southeast of the Arabian peninsula.

References

Monotypic Apiaceae genera
Apiaceae